Info Wars (styled as info wars) is a 2004 documentary film about the mechanics of modern information warfare and media hacking. It shows some of the ways special interests manipulate modern mass media to reach their ends. It explains the ways the flow of mass media could turn the tide in any battle, real or online.

The film is named after InfoWars, launched in 1999.

See also 
 Digital Millennium Copyright Act (DMCA)
 Content-scrambling system (CSS)
 2600: The Hacker Quarterly
 Jon Lech Johansen
 Electronic Frontier Foundation (EFF)
 Voteauction
 Noam Chomsky's Manufacturing Consent
 Infowars

References

External links 
 
 

2004 films
Austrian documentary films
Documentary films about the Internet